University of Economics may refer to:

 University of Economics in Bratislava, Slovakia
 Cracow University of Economics, Poland
 University of Economics, Ho Chi Minh City, Vietnam
 University of Economics in Katowice, Poland
 Poznań University of Economics, Poland
 University of Economics, Prague, Czech Republic
 University of Economics Varna, Bulgaria
 Vienna University of Economics and Business, Austria
 Wrocław University of Economics, Poland
 University of Economics and Innovation, Lublin, Poland